Harry Little may refer to:

 Harry Little (baseball) (1850–1927), American Major League Baseball player 
 Harry Little (architect) (died 1944), American architect

See also
Henry Little (disambiguation)
Harold Little (1893–1958), Canadian rower